Sleutelstad FM is a Dutch local radio channel in Leiden, Netherlands. Sleutelstad FM plays music from the 70's to present-day trends. The programming also includes information and music at the local and regional stage. Sleutelstad FM plays music from various musicians from Leiden and the surrounding area.

Sleutelstad FM also broadcasts the international news every hour and provides an update of the local news every half an hour. The broadcasts can be listened to via the internet or apps such as TuneIn.

Radio stations in the Netherlands